is a Prefectural Natural Park on the coast of southwest Kumamoto Prefecture, Japan. Established in 1956, the park spans the municipalities of Ashikita, Minamata, Tsunagi, and Yatsushiro.

See also
 National Parks of Japan
 Unzen-Amakusa National Park

References

External links
  Map of Natural Parks of Kumamoto Prefecture

Parks and gardens in Kumamoto Prefecture
Protected areas established in 1956
1956 establishments in Japan